Brow Head is the most southerly point of mainland Ireland. It is in the rural townland of Mallavogue near Crookhaven in County Cork, Ireland. It is 3.8 km east of Mizen Head at latitude 51.43ºN.

History
Ptolemy's Geography (2nd century AD) described a point called Νοτιον (Notion, "southern promontory") which referred to Brow Head.

References

Headlands of County Cork